Elachista maculoscella is a moth of the family Elachistidae. It is found in North America, where it has been recorded from Manitoba, Ontario, Massachusetts, Ohio and Pennsylvania.

The wingspan is 6.5–7 mm. The forewings are dark bronzy brown with silvery white or faintly golden tinged markings. There is a silvery patch at the base of the wing, as well as a silvery fascia before the middle and a triangular silvery spot at the tornus. The hindwings are brownish grey, faintly bronzy. Adults have been recorded on wing in July.

References

maculoscella
Moths described in 1860
Moths of North America